The 1992 1. divisjon season, the highest women's football (soccer) league in Norway, began on 25 April 1992 and ended on 17 October 1992.

18 games were played with 3 points given for wins and 1 for draws. Number nine and ten were relegated, while two teams from the 2. divisjon were promoted through a playoff round.

Asker won the league, losing only one game.

League table

Top goalscorers
 22 goals:
  Petra Bartelmann, Asker
 17 goals:
  Birthe Hegstad, Klepp
  Hege Riise, Setskog/Høland
 16 goals:
  Margunn Humlestøl, Asker
 15 goals:
  Agnete Carlsen, Sprint/Jeløy
 12 goals:
  Ann Kristin Aarønes, Spjelkavik
 11 goals:
  Åse Iren Steine, Sandviken
 10 goals:
  Elin Krokan, Setskog/Høland
  Eva Gjelten, Trondheims-Ørn
 9 goals:
  Hilde Dvergsdal, Asker
  Julie Andreassen, Grand Bodø
  Lena Haugen, Setskog/Høland
  Brit Sandaune, Trondheims-Ørn
  Ann Kristin Østgård, Trondheims-Ørn

Promotion and relegation
 Bøler and Spjelkavik were relegated to the 2. divisjon.
 Donn and Fløya were promoted from the 2. divisjon through playoff.

References

League table
Fixtures
Goalscorers

Norwegian First Division (women) seasons
Top level Norwegian women's football league seasons
1
Nor
Nor